was a Japanese geographer and regarded as the father of modern Japanese geography. 

He was a professor at Tokyo Imperial University from 1911 to 1929, where he created the department of geography and founded The Association of Japanese Geographers. The latter is the primary academic geographic society in Japan.

Books
地理学教科書(Chirigaku Kyokasyo)1900
大日本地誌(Dainihon Chishi)1903-1915
我が南洋(Waga nanyo)1916

Articles 
氷河果して本邦に存在せざりしか(Hyoga shtashite hompo ni sonzaisezarishika)1902

See also 
Bunjirō Kotō
Yamasaki Cirque

References 

Japanese geographers
1870 births
1929 deaths